Rada or de Rada (the latter of possibly Spanish origin) is a surname. Notable people with the surname include:

 Alfredo Rada (born 1965), Bolivian former government minister
 Antonio Rada (1937–2014), Colombian footballer
 Dino Rađa (born 1967), Croatian basketball player
 Edmundo Rada (disappeared 2019), Venezuelan politician
 Filip Rada (born 1984), Czech football player
 Ionuț Rada (footballer, born 1982), Romanian footballer
 Ionuț Rada (footballer, born 1990), Romanian footballer
 Jakub Rada (born 1987), Czech footballer
 Karel Rada (born 1971), Czech footballer
 Marian Rada (born 1960), Romanian former footballer
 Miroslav Rada, Czech footballer
 Petr Rada (born 1958), Czech football coach and former player
 Roy Rada (born 1951), American computer scientist
 Rubén Rada (born 1943), Uruguayan candombe singer
 Sergio Rada (born 1984), Colombian weightlifter
 Tair Rada (died 2006), murdered 13-year-old Israeli schoolgirl
 Tomáš Rada (born 1983), Czech footballer
 Yara Bou Rada (born 2000), Lebanese footballer
 Jeronim de Rada (1814–1903), Albanian-Italian poet and writer
 Martín de Rada (1533–1578), Spanish Augustinian friar, missionary and traveler
 Rodrigo Jiménez de Rada (1170–1247), Spanish Roman Catholic bishop and historian

References

Czech-language surnames
Spanish-language surnames